The New Zealand National Party leadership election was an election for the National leadership position in 2001.

Background

In October 2001, after months of speculation, Jenny Shipley resigned as leader of the National Party after being told she no longer had the support of the party caucus. Bill English was elected as her replacement unopposed (with Roger Sowry as his deputy), and consequently became Leader of the Opposition. However, he did not openly organise against Shipley, and according to The Southland Times "there was almost an element of 'aw, shucks, I'll do it then' about Mr English's ascension".

Aged 39 when he was elected, English became the second-youngest leader in the National Party's history, after Jim McLay (who was 38 when elected in 1984). He also became only the third Southlander to lead a major New Zealand political party, after Joseph Ward and Adam Hamilton.

References

2001 elections in New Zealand
2001
October 2001 events in New Zealand
New Zealand National Party leadership election